is a Japanese rock band. The band's current members are musicians Miku Nakamura and Shunsuke Matsumoto; previously in the group were Kōjirō Yamazaki and Ryōsuke Fujita.  

Formed in 2011, Cö shu Nie's early work consisted of independent releases, debuting with the single "Maze" and releasing the mini-album Hydra in 2013. Cö shu Nie signed with Sony Music Japan in 2018, making their major label debut with the release of their single "Asphyxia" through Sony Music Japan, which was used as the opening theme in the series Tokyo Ghoul:re and marked their first work to enter the Oricon chart. Simultaneously released was their debut extended play Aurora, which made it to the Oricon and Billboard Japan charts.  

In 2019, Cö shu Nie released their debut studio album, Pure, which opened to significant critical and commercial success; the album includes "Asphyxia" as well as the singles "Zettai Zetsumei" and "Bullet", which were used in The Promised Neverland and Psycho-Pass 3, respectively. Released in 2020, during the COVID-19 pandemic, was the extended play Litmus. The year following, "Give It Back" was released, included in the anime Jujutsu Kaisen and peaking at 14 on the Oricon charts, their highest grossing-single to date.

History

2011–2017: Early years 
Cö shu Nie was formed in 2011, the initial lineup being Miku Nakamura, Shunsuke Matsumoto and Kōjirō Yamazaki. Nakamura is the group's primarily vocalist, keyboardist and manipulator, while she and Matsumoto both perform on guitar. Until Yamazaki's leave in 2017,  he primarily performed on drums. Their early work consisted of producing and writing independently, debuting with the single "Maze" which was released that same year. The band released the mini albums Hydra and Org in December 2013, done through two separate labels (Silver Star Records and Vibrateshow Records, respectively). Cö shu Nie would continue to work on small-scale projects, generally switching between Silver Star Records and Vibrateshow Records before they self-released their fourth mini-album, Overkill in 2017. That same year, it was announced Kōjirō Yamazaki would depart from the group.

2018–present: Breakthrough and Pure 
Following a period of independent releases, Cö shu Nie would achieve their major breakthrough in 2018, following both their signing to the Sony Music Entertainment Japan label and the addition of member Ryōsuke Fujita, who performed on drums. Cö shu Nie subsequently released their debut extended play Aurora, which was their first work to achieve significant commercial success, making it onto the charts of Oricon and Billboard Japan. Following Aurora, the single "Asphyxia" was released, used as the first theme song for the anime series Tokyo Ghoul:re, which similarly earned positions on the Oricon charts and acclaim upon release. In 2019, Cö shu Nie announced that their debut album would be released, revealing itself to be titled Pure and featuring their previous single "Asphyxia". The album peaked at number 29 and 27 on the Oricon and Billboard Japan charts respectively, particularly due to the international reach with the singles "Zettai Zetsumei", used as the ending theme song of The Promised Neverland's first season, and "Bullet", included as the ending theme for Psycho-Pass 3. Pure was acclaimed by critics and audiences, who highlighted how its "sense of unpredictability goes a long way to making Pure an exhilarating listen." 

Cö shu Nie announced their self-titled Japan Tour, which sold-out tickets and was set for dates in 2020, however it was cancelled due to the COVID-19 pandemic. They began 2020 with the single "Flare", curated to inspire fans who were in quarantine resulted by the spread of Coronavirus. Their extended play, Litmus, was released thereafter to critical and commercial success, and includes "Flare" in addition. In 2021, they performed the song "Give It Back" for Jujutsu Kaisen, which finished 14th on the Oricon Charts. That same year, Fujita announced his exit from the band. Billboard Japan announced that the drama series Women's War: Bachelor Murder Case will feature the band's single,  "undress me", which marks their first live action feature, and was released in 2021. Cö shu Nie will write the upcoming single "Phoenix Prayer", set to be sung by Eir Aoi, and perform "Sakura Burst", both featured in Code Geass: Lelouch of the Rebellion.

Artistry 
Early in their career, Cö shu Nie's initial focus was "concentrating only on expressing small thoughts from our minds, like spreading spores from our own world that we created in our hearts." The group is recognized for their unique themes and frequent changes in aesthetic style; guitarist Matsumoto credited this primarily to Nakamura, stating that "The theme for each song is always completed in Director (Nakamura)’s mind beforehand. At the point in which we listen to the finished song, all of the members have shared her vision, and can conceptually understand what she’s trying to express, like "Oh, this is what you mean."  However, her vision is never constant, and changes each time depending on her mood. Even I don’t know what will come next." 

On their inspirations, Nakamura said that "Everything in life is an inspiration. Like how I’m talking with you right now, or what I eat, there are things that you can feel but can’t verbally express, right? Those things keep getting stacked within me, and suddenly become music." Matsumoto later affirmed this by describing how "she would hit metal objects and record them for songs. Even now, when we go into the woods, she’d be recording sounds on his phone, and later show me the songs she’d made from them. So it really is true that everything in the world is an influence for her."

Members
Current members
 Miku Nakamura (中村未来) — vocals, guitar, keyboards, manipulator 
 Shunsuke Matsumoto (松本駿介) — bass guitar 

Former members
 Kōjirō Yamazaki (ヤマザキコウジロウ) — drums 
 Ryōsuke Fujita (藤田亮介) — drums

Timeline

Discography

Albums

Mini albums

Extended plays

Singles

References

External links
 
 
 

2011 establishments in Japan
Japanese indie rock groups
Japanese musical trios
Japanese pop rock music groups
Musical groups established in 2011
Musical groups from Osaka Prefecture
Sony Music Entertainment Japan artists